Populus yunnanensis, the Yunnan poplar, is a species of flowering plant in the family Salicaceae, native to south-central China. It has found use as a street tree, particularly in Australia.

Subtaxa
The following varieties are accepted:
Populus yunnanensis var. microphylla  – Yunnan
Populus yunnanensis var. yunnanensis – Sichuan, Yunnan, Guizhou

References

yunnanensis
Trees of China
Endemic flora of China
Flora of South-Central China
Plants described in 1905